The Muzaffarpur–SMVT Bengaluru Weekly Express is an Express train belonging to East Central Railway zone that runs between  and  in India. It is currently being operated with 15227/15228 train numbers on a weekly basis.

Service

The 15227/Yesvantpur–Muzaffarpur Weekly Express has an average speed of 52 km/hr and covers 2734 km in 52h 5m. The 15228/Muzaffarpur–Yesvantpur Weekly Express has an average speed of 52 km/hr and covers 2734 km in 52h 5m.

Schedule

Route and halts 

The important halts of the train are:

 
 
 
 
 
  (Chennai)

Coach composition

The train has highly refurbished LHB rakes with a max speed of 110 kmph. The train consists of 22 coaches:

 1 AC First Class
 2 AC Two Tier
 6 AC Three Tier
 6 Sleeper coaches
 1 Pantry car
 4 General Unreserved
 2 End On Generator Cars (EOG)

Traction

Both trains are hauled by a Royapuram Loco Shed-based WAP-4 electric locomotive from Bengaluru to Visakhapatnam. From Visakhapatnam, train is hauled by a Howrah Loco Shed-based WAP-4 uptil Muzaffarpur and vice versa.

Direction reversal

The train reverses its direction 1 time:

See also 

 Yesvantpur Junction railway station
 Muzaffarpur Junction railway station
 Bhagmati Express

Notes

References

External links 

 15227/Yesvantpur - Muzaffarpur Weekly Express India Rail Info
 15228/Muzaffarpur - Yesvantpur Weekly Express India Rail Info

Transport in Bangalore
Transport in Muzaffarpur
Express trains in India
Rail transport in Karnataka
Rail transport in Tamil Nadu
Rail transport in Andhra Pradesh
Rail transport in Odisha
Rail transport in West Bengal
Rail transport in Bihar
Railway services introduced in 2004